This is a list of current and defunct basketball leagues around the world.

Men

Intercontinental 
 FIBA Intercontinental Cup

Africa

International leagues 
 BAL – Basketball Africa League 
 FIBA Africa Clubs Champions Cup

National leagues 

 ABC Super Division – Algerian Basketball Championship Super Division

 ABL – Angolan Basketball League – first tier
 ABC – Angola Second Division Basketball Championship – second tier

 CABL – Central African Division I Basketball League

 GSP Basketball League

 EBSL – Egyptian Basketball Super League

 LBA League

 LBL – Libyan Division I Basketball League

 Nationale 1

 MBL – Mozambican Division I Basketball League

 NPL – Nigerian Premier League

 NBL – National Basketball League

 SBL – Senegalese Division I Basketball League

 BNL – Basketball National League

 TBL – Tunisian Division I Basketball League

 NBL – National Basketball League

Americas

International leagues 
 BCLA – Basketball Champions League Americas 
 FIBA Americas League
 Liga Sudamericana

National leagues 

 LNB – Liga Nacional de Básquet – first tier
 TNA – Torneo Nacional de Ascenso – second tier

 Libobasquet

 CBB – Campeonato Brasileiro de Basquete – first tier
 NBB – Novo Basquete Brasil – first tier
 Liga Ouro de Basquete (Brazil) – second tier
 LDB – Liga de Desenvolvimento de Basquete (Under-22 League) – third tier

 NBA – National Basketball Association (Toronto Raptors) 
NBA G League (Raptors 905)
 CEBL – Canadian Elite Basketball League
 NBLC – National Basketball League of Canada

 LNM – Liga Nacional Movistar

 BPC – Baloncesto Profesional Colombiano

 LBSCR – Liga de Baloncesto Superior de Costa Rica

 LSB – Liga Superior de Baloncesto

 LNB – Liga Nacional de Baloncesto

 LEB – Liga Ecuatoriana de Baloncesto

 LSBES – Liga Superior de Baloncesto de El Salvador

 LNBP – Liga Nacional de Baloncesto Profesional – first tier
 CIBACOPA – Circuito de Baloncesto de la Costa del Pacífico – second tier
NBA G League – first tier Minor League

 ACB League
 LNB – Liga Nicaragüense de Baloncesto (2018–present)

 LPB – Liga Profesional de Baloncesto (2015–present)

 PMBL – Paraguayan Metropolitan Basketball League

 LBL – Liga de Basket de Lima
 LNB – Liga Nacional de Basketball

 BSN – Baloncesto Superior Nacional
 BSNF –  Baloncesto Superior Nacional Femenino

 LUB – Liga Uruguaya de Basketball

 NBA – National Basketball Association
NBA G League
 ABA – American Basketball Association
 ECBL – East Coast Basketball League
 FBA – Florida Basketball Association
 MBL – Maximum Basketball League
 NABL – North American Basketball League
 NNBA – New Nation Basketball Association
 PBL – Premier Basketball League
 TBL – The Basketball League
 UBA – Universal Basketball Association
 UBL – United Basketball League

College and university basketball 

 OUA – Wilson Cup
 U Sports – W. P. McGee Trophy

 ACCA – Association of Christian College Athletics
Bible College NIT
 CCCAA – California Community College Athletic Association
 NAIA Division I – NAIA Men's Division I Basketball Championship
 NAIA Division II – NAIA Men's Division II Basketball Championship
 NCAA Division I – NCAA Men's Division I Basketball Championship
 NCAA Division II – NCAA Men's Division II Basketball Championship
 NCAA Division III – NCAA Men's Division III Basketball Championship
 NCCAA – List of NCCAA men's basketball champions
 NIT – National Invitation Tournament
 NJCAA Division I – NJCAA Men's Division I Basketball Championship
 NJCAA Division II – NJCAA Men's Division II Basketball Championship
 NJCAA Division III – NJCAA Men's Division III Basketball Championship
 NWAC – Northwest Athletic Conference
 USCAA – United States Collegiate Athletic Association

Youth leagues 
 AAU – Amateur Athletic Union
 USSSA – United States Specialty Sports Association

 LPB – Liga Profesional de Baloncesto

Asia

International leagues 
 ABL – ASEAN Basketball League
 East Asia Super League
 FIBA Asia Champions Cup
 WABA – WABA Champions Cup
 West Asia Super League

National leagues 

 BPL – Bahraini Premier League

 CBA – Chinese Basketball Association – first tier
 NBL – National Basketball League – second tier
 CUBA – Chinese University Basketball Association – third tier
 CHBL – China High School Basketball League – fourth tier

 A1 – Hong Kong A1 Division Championship

 INBC – Indian National Basketball Championship for Men
 INBL - Indian National Basketball League 
 EPBL – Elite Pro Basketball League 

 IBL – Indonesian Basketball League

 IBSL – Iranian Basketball Super League

 IBL – Iraqi Division I Basketball League

 KBC – Kazakhstan Basketball Championship – first tier
 KBC – Kazakhstan Basketball Cup – second tier

 KBL – Kuwaiti Division I Basketball League

 B.League – first tier since 2016–17
 B.League Division Two – second tier
 B.League Division Three – third tier
 AJIBC - All Japan Intercollegiate Basketball Championship – fourth tier

 JPBL – Jordanian Premier Basketball League - first tier
 First Division - second tier

 FLB League – Lebanese Basketball League

 MNBA – Mongolian National Basketball Association

 OBL – Oman Basketball League

 (Philippine basketball is not divided into a tier-like league system)

The Games and Amusements Board (GAB) issues professional licenses for players playing in professional leagues. GAB had instructed amateur leagues that are paying its players to be under its belt. Due to the COVID-19 pandemic, this hasn't been applied as the GAB has only allowed professional leagues (of any sport) to operate.

 Professional leagues
 Chooks-to-Go Pilipinas 3x3
 Filbasket 
 Maharlika Pilipinas Basketball League 
 National Basketball League
 Philippine Basketball Association
 Pilipinas Super League 
 Pilipinas VisMin Super Cup 
 Women's National Basketball League 

 Amateur leagues:
 PBA Developmental League 
 Community Basketball Association 
 Metro League
 College basketball (many college leagues also offer high school basketball tournaments):
 CESAFI – Cebu Schools Athletic Foundation, Inc.
 COSAA – Cagayan de Oro Schools Athletics Association
 CUSA – Colleges and Universities Sports Association
 ISSA – Iloilo Schools Sports Association
 LCUAA – Laguna Colleges and Universities Athletic Association
 MNCAA – Men's National Collegiate Athletic Association
 NAASCU – National Athletic Association of Schools, Colleges and Universities
 NCAA – National Collegiate Athletic Association Basketball Championship
 NCAA South – National Collegiate Athletic Association – South
 NCRAA – National Capital Region Athletic Association
 PCCL – Philippine Collegiate Championship League
 SCUAA – State Colleges and Universities Athletic Association
 UAAP – University Athletic Association of the Philippines Basketball Championship
 UCAA – Universities and Colleges Athletic Association
 UCBL – Universities and Colleges Basketball League
 UCCL – United Calabarzon Collegiate League
 UCLAA – United Central Luzon Athletic Association
 High school basketball: 
 PSSBC – Philippine Secondary Schools Basketball Championship
PRISSAA – Private Secondary Schools Athletics Association

 QBL – Qatari Basketball League

 SPL – Saudi Premier League

 Pro-Am SBL - Pro-Am Singapore Basketball League
 Merlion Cup

 KBL – Korean Basketball League – first tier
 KBL R–League – KBL Reserve League – second tier
 KUBL – Korea University Basketball League – third tier

 SBL – Syrian Basketball League

 PLG – P. League+ – first tier (professional)
 T1 – T1 League – first tier (professional)
 SBL – Super Basketball League – second tier (semi-professional)
 A League – third tier (amateur)
 UBA – University Basketball Alliance – fourth tier
 HBL – High School Basketball League – fifth tier

 TBL – Thailand Basketball League

 NBL – UAE National Basketball League

 VBA – Vietnam Basketball Association

College and university basketball 

 CUBA – Chinese University Basketball Association

 LIMA – Liga Mahasiswa

 (many college leagues also offer high school basketball tournaments):
 CESAFI – Cebu Schools Athletic Foundation, Inc.
 COSAA – Cagayan de Oro Schools Athletics Association
 CUSA – Colleges and Universities Sports Association
 ISSA – Iloilo Schools Sports Association
 LCUAA – Laguna Colleges and Universities Athletic Association
 MNCAA – Men's National Collegiate Athletic Association
 NAASCU – National Athletic Association of Schools, Colleges and Universities
 NCAA – National Collegiate Athletic Association Basketball Championship
 NCAA South – National Collegiate Athletic Association – South
 NCRAA – National Capital Region Athletic Association
 PCCL – Philippine Collegiate Championship League
 SCUAA – State Colleges and Universities Athletic Association
 UAAP – University Athletic Association of the Philippines Basketball Championship
 UCAA – Universities and Colleges Athletic Association
 UCBL – Universities and Colleges Basketball League
 UCCL – United Calabarzon Collegiate League
 UCLAA – United Central Luzon Athletic Association

 U-League

 UBA – University Basketball Alliance

Youth leagues 

 CHBL – China High School Basketball League

 DBL – Developmental Basketball League

 PSSBC – Philippine Secondary Schools Basketball Championship
PRISSAA – Private Secondary Schools Athletics Association

 HBL – High School Basketball League

Europe

International leagues

Continental Leagues 
Clubs participate pan-European leagues in two ways. Larger clubs play in Euroleague Basketball's system, with several of them having long-term licenses and others having annual licenses (irrespective of domestic league results), akin to the franchise model in North American sports. The Basketball Champions League (BCL) is the other way clubs participate, which is mostly based on sporting merit. A club usually opts to play in the EuroLeague instead of the BCL if it qualifies for both.

 BCL – Basketball Champions League – organized by FIBA Europe
 FIBA Europe Cup – organized by FIBA Europe
 EuroLeague – organized by Euroleague Basketball
 EuroCup – organized by Euroleague Basketball

Subregional leagues 
 AAC – Alpe Adria Cup – featuring teams from Austria, Croatia, Czechia (Czech Republic), Hungary, Poland, Romania, Slovakia and Slovenia
 ABA League (also known as the Adriatic League) – first tier league featuring teams from Bosnia and Herzegovina, Croatia, Montenegro, North Macedonia, Serbia and Slovenia
 ABA League Second Division – second tier
 BIBL – Balkan International Basketball League – featuring teams from Albania, Bulgaria, Israel, Kosovo, Montenegro and North Macedonia
 VTB–League – VTB United League – featuring teams from Belarus, Kazakhstan, and Russia

National leagues 

 ABSL – Albanian Basketball Superliga – first tier
 ABFD – Albanian Basketball First Division – second tier

 ÖBL – Österreichische Basketball Bundesliga

 ABL – Armenia Basketball League A

 ABL – Azerbaijan Basketball League

 BPL – Belarusian Premier League

 & 
 BNXT League – first tier in both countries from 2021-22 season onward

 BCBH – Basketball Championship of Bosnia and Herzegovina – first tier
 A1 Liga – second tier

 NBL – National Basketball League

 A-1 Liga

 Cyprus Basketball Division 1

 NBL – National Basketball League, also called the Kooperativa NBL for sponsorship reasons

 DBL – Danish Basketball League

 KML – Korvpalli Meistriliiga

 Korisliiga – first tier
 I Division – second tier

 LNB Pro A – Ligue Nationale de Basketball Pro A – first tier
 LNB Pro B – Ligue Nationale de Basket Pro B – second tier

 GSL – Georgian Superliga

 BBL – Basketball Bundesliga – first tier
 ProA – second tier
 ProB – third tier

 GBL – Greek Basket League – first tier
 GBL A2 – Greek A2 Basket League – second tier
 GBL B – Greek B Basket League – third tier
 GBL C – Greek C Basket League – fourth tier

 Nemzeti Bajnokság I/A

 Premier League
 First Division

 IBPL – Israeli Basketball Premier League – first tier
 Liga Leumit – second tier
 Liga Artzit – third tier

 Serie A – first tier
 Serie A2 – second tier
 Serie B – third tier
 Serie C Gold – fourth tier
 Serie C Silver – fifth tier
 Serie D Regionale – sixth tier
 Promozione – seventh tier

 KBSL – Kosovo Basketball Superleague – first tier
 KBFL – Kosovo Basketball First League – second tier

 LBL – Latvijas Basketbola līga

 LKL – Lietuvos Krepšinio Lyga – first tier
 NKL – Nacionalinė Krepšinio Lyga – second tier
 RKL – Regioninė Krepšinio Lyga – third tier

 Total League
 Nationale 2

 MFL – Macedonian First League

 MBL – Montenegrin Basketball League

 Promotiedivisie – second tier; top purely domestic level from 2021 to 2022

 BLNO

 PLK – Polska Liga Koszykówki (Polish Basketball League) – first tier
 I Liga – second tier
 II Liga – third tier

 LCB – Portuguese Basketball League
 Proliga

 Divizia A

 VTB–League – VTB United League – first tier since the 2012–13 season (also featuring teams from Belarus, Estonia, Kazakhstan and Poland)
 BSL 1 – Basketball Super League 1 – second tier; was the first tier league from 1992 to 2010
 BSL 2 – Basketball Super League 2 – third tier
 First League – fourth tier
 VTB-League U21 – fifth tier

 BLS – Basketball League of Serbia – first tier
 BLS B – Basketball League of Serbia B – second tier
 RBL First Division – Regional Basketball League First Division – third tier
 RBL Second Division – Regional Basketball League Second Division – fourth tier

 SEL Slovak Extraliga

 1. A SKL – Premier A Slovenian Basketball League (also known for sponsorship reasons as Liga Telemach) – first tier
 SSBL – Slovenian Second Basketball League – second tier
 SBL – School Basketball League – third tier

 Liga Endesa – first tier
 LEB Oro – second tier
 LEB Plata – third tier
 Liga EBA – fourth tier
 Primera División – fifth tier

 SBL – Swedish Basketball League (Ligan) – first tier
 Basketettan – second tier

 LNBA – Swiss Basketball League – first tier
 Championnat LNB – second tier

 BSL – Turkish Basketball Super League – first tier
 TBL – Turkish Basketball First League – second tier
 TB2L – Turkish Basketball Second League – third tier
 TRBL – Turkish Regional Basketball League – fourth tier

 UBSL – Ukrainian Basketball Superleague – first tier
 Higher League – second tier

 Super League

 BBL – British Basketball League – First Tier
 NBL - National Basketball League – Second Tier
 SBC – Scottish Basketball Championship – Second Tier

Oceania 

 NBL – National Basketball League – Major League
 NBL1 – Minor League
 Big V – Minor League

 GBA – Guam Basketball Association

 NBL – National Basketball League

Women

Africa 
 FIBA Africa Women's Clubs Champions Cup
 Arab Women's Club Basketball Championship
 
National leagues
 

 AWBL - Angola Women's Basketball League
 

 MWBC - Moroccan Women's Basketball Championship
 

 Tunisian Women's Division I Basketball League
 

 ZWBL - Zenith Women Basketball League

Americas 

 Women's National Basketball Association (WNBA)
Athletes Unlimited Basketball (AUB)
Women's American Basketball Association (WABA)
Women's Basketball Development Association (WBDA)
 
College basketball
 NCAA Division I women's basketball tournament (NCAA Division I Women's)
 NCAA Division II women's basketball tournament (NCAA Division II Women's)
 NCAA Division III women's basketball tournament (NCAA Division III Women's)
 Women's National Invitation Tournament (WNIT)
 NAIA Division I Women's Basketball Championships (NAIA Division I Women's)
 NAIA Division II Women's Basketball Championships (NAIA Division II Women's)
 Association of Christian College Athletics
 NCCAA Women's Basketball (NCCAA Women's)
 NJCAA Division I Women's Basketball Championship (NJCAA Division I Women's)
 NJCAA Division II Women's Basketball Championship (NJCAA Division II Women's)
 NJCAA Division III Women's Basketball Championship (NJCAA Division III Women's)
 USCAA Women's Basketball (USCAA Women's)

Youth leagues
 AAU
 USSSA
 YBOA

University basketball
 U Sports

 Baloncesto Superior Nacional Femenino (BSNF)

Asia 

 WCBA - Women's Chinese Basketball Association - first tier
 WCUBA - Women's Chinese University Basketball Association - second tier
 

 WHKBA - Women's Hong Kong Basketball Association
 

 Indian National Basketball Championship for Women
 

 Srikandi Cup
 

 WJBL - Women's Japan Basketball League
 

 Women's Next5Hoops
 WNBL — Women's National Basketball League
 
Filipino College Basketball
 UAAP - University Athletic Association of the Philippines
 WNCAA - Women's National Collegiate Athletic Association
 NAASCU - National Athletic Association of Schools, Colleges and Universities
 

 WKBL - Women's Korean Basketball League
 
 (Taiwan)
 WSBL - Women's Super Basketball League
 

 WTBL - Women's Thailand Basketball League

Europe 
 
 EuroLeague
 EuroCup
 Europe SuperCup
 Baltic Women's League

 Albanian A-1 League

 AWBB - Austrian Women's Basketball Bundesliga

 BWBL - Belgian Women's Basketball League

 Basketball Championship of Bosnia and Herzegovina (Women)

 Bulgarian Women's Basketball Championship

 Prva ženska liga - Croatian First Women's Basketball League

 Cyprus Women's Basketball Division A
 Kadınlar Basketbol Ligi - Women's Basketball League

 Česká ženská basketbalová liga - Czech Women's Basketball League

 Women's Danish Basketball League

 LFB – Ligue Féminine de Basketball

 WKML - Women's Korvpalli Meistriliiga

 Naisten Korisliiga

 Women's Basketball Bundesliga

 Greek Women's Basket - first tier
 Greek A2 Women's Basket - second tier

 Nemzeti Bajnokság I/A for Women's

 Úrvalsdeild kvenna - Premier league women

 Israeli Female Basketball Premier League

 LegA Basket Femminile Serie A1 - first tier
 Serie A2 - second tier
 Serie B d'Eccellenza - third tier

 Latvijas Sieviešu basketbola līga

 LMKL - Lithuanian Women's Basketball League

 Total League - Dames

 First Women's Basketball League of Macedonia

 First A Women's Basketball League of Montenegro

 Vrouwen Basketball League

 BLK – Basket Liga Kobiet (first tier)
 I Liga (second tier)

 LFB - Premier Women's Basketball League

 Divizia A

 Russian Women's Basketball Premier League
 Superleague
 Higher League

 Adriatic League
 First Women's Basketball League of Serbia

 Slovak Women's Basketball Extraliga

 Slovenian Women's Basketball League

 LFB – Liga Femenina de Baloncesto Ligue Féminine de Basketball
 LF2B - Liga Femenina 2 de Baloncesto Ligue Féminine 2 de Basketball

 Basketligan dam

 Swiss Women's Basketball Championship

 TWBL - Turkish Women's Basketball League

 UWBSL, Ukrainian Women's Basketball SuperLeague

 WBBL - Women's British Basketball League
 EWBL - English Women's Basketball League
 SWNL - Scottish Women's National League

Oceania 

 WNBL – Women's National Basketball League
 

 Tauihi Basketball Aotearoa – first tier
 D-League – Women's Development League – second tier

Defunct leagues

Men

World 
 McDonald's Championship, 1987-1999

Americas 

 National Basketball League (NBL), 1993–94
 Canadian National Basketball League (CNBL), 2002–2004

 Amateur Athletic Association Basketball (AAU), 1897–1982
 National Basketball League (NBL), 1898–99 to 1903-04
 Philadelphia Basketball League (PBL), 1902–1909
 New England Basketball League (NEBL), 1903–1904
 Western Massachusetts Basketball League (WMBL), 1903–1904
 Western Pennsylvania Basketball League (WPBL), 1903–1904; 1912–1913; 1914–1915
 New England Basketball Association (NEBA), 1904–1905
 Mohawk Valley League (MVL), 1906–1910
 Central Basketball League (CBL), 1906–1912
 Hudson River League (HRL), 1909–12
 Eastern Basketball League (EBL), 1909–1933
 New York State League (NYSL), 1911–23
 Pennsylvania State League (PSL), 1914–1921
 Interstate Basketball League (IBL), 1915–1920
 Interstate League (IL), 1919–1923
 Metropolitan Basketball League (MBL), 1921–1928
 American Basketball League (ABL), 1925–1955
 National Basketball League (NBL), 1926–27
 National Basketball League (NBL), 1929–30
 National Basketball League (NBL), 1932–33
 Midwest Basketball Conference (MBC), 1935–1937; became National Basketball League with 1937–38 season.
 National Basketball League (NBL), 1937–1949; merged with the Basketball Association of America to become the National Basketball Association.
 World Professional Basketball Tournament (WPBT), 1939–1948
 Eastern Pro League (EPL)
 Pacific Coast Professional Basketball League (PCPBL), 1946–1948
 Basketball Association of America (BAA), 1946–1949; merged with the National Basketball League to become the National Basketball Association.
 New York State Professional Basketball League (NYSPL), 1946–1949
 Continental Basketball Association (CBA), 1946–2009; originally named Eastern Pennsylvania Basketball League, then Eastern Professional Basketball League.
 Professional Basketball League of America (PBLA), 1947–1948
 National Industrial Basketball League (NIBL), 1947–1961
 National Professional Basketball League (NPBL), 1950–1951
 American Basketball League (ABL), 1961–1963
 Midwest Professional Basketball League (MPBL) (1961-1964)
 North American Basketball League (1964-1968), (NABL) 1964–1968
 American Basketball Association (ABA), 1967–1976
 All-American Basketball Alliance (AABA), 1977–78
 Western Basketball Association (WBA), 1978–79
 World Basketball League (WBL), 1988–1992; was founded as the International Basketball Association in November 1987, before changing its name prior to the 1988 season.
 Global Basketball Association (GBA), 1991-92 - December 1992; league folded midway through 1992–93 season.
 International Basketball Association (IBA), 1995–2001
 International Basketball League (IBL), 1999–2001
 National Rookie League (NRL), 2000
 All-American Professional Basketball League (AAPBL), 2005
 United States Basketball League (USBL)
 National Professional Basketball League (NPBL)
 All-American Basketball Alliance (2010)
 Global Professional Basketball League (GPBL)
 Global Professional Basketball League 2 (GPBL 2)
 United Regions Basketball League (URBL)
 National Alliance Basketball League (NABL)
 National Athletic Basketball League (NABL)
 Universal Basketball League (UBL)
 Minor League Basketball Association (MLBA) 
 Continental Basketball League (CBL)
 American Basketball League (ABL)
 Eastern Basketball Alliance (EBA)
 West Coast Pro Basketball League (WCBL)
 International Basketball League (IBL)

Asia 

 Chinese New Basketball Alliance (CNBA), 1996–97
 Chinese University Basketball Super League (CUBS), 2004–15

 
 UBA Pro Basketball League, 2015–17

 bj league - Basketball Japan League, 2005–16
 JBL - Japan Basketball League, 2007–2013
 NBL - National Basketball League, 2013–16

 MNBL - Malaysia National Basketball League, 1981–2013

 Philippine Basketball League (PBL), 1983–2011
 Manila Industrial and Commercial Athletic Association (MICAA), 1938-1981
 Metropolitan Basketball Association (MBA), 1998–2002
 Liga Pilipinas (LP), 2008–2011

 (Taiwan)
 Chinese Basketball Alliance (CBA), 1995–1999

Europe 
Subregional leagues
 BBL – Baltic Basketball League - teams from the Baltic states of Estonia, Latvia and Lithuania plus Sweden
 CEBL – Central European Basketball League

National leagues

 Pro Basketball League (PBL), 1925–2021; replaced by the BNXT League

 National Basketball League (NBL), 1972–2003

 Dutch Basketball League (DBL), 1960–2021; replaced by the BNXT League

 Professional Basketball League (PBL), 2010–2013; superseded by the VTB United League
Former Yugoslavia
 Yugoslav Basketball League

Oceania 

 Australian Basketball Association (ABA), 1965–2008
 South East Australian Basketball League (SEABL), 1981–2018

 Conference Basketball League (CBL), 1981–2010

Women

Americas 

 Women's Professional Basketball Association (WPBA), 1975; the league folded before it ever started.
 Women's Professional Basketball League (WBL), 1978–1981
 Ladies Professional Basketball Association (LPBA), 1980–81; formed as a rival league to the WBL when the WBL began to experience financial problems. The league was poorly organized and played only five (or seven) games before disbanding with three teams never playing a game.
 Women's American Basketball Association (WABA), 1984 See: (WABA)
 National Women's Basketball Association (NWBA), 1986; the league folded right before the season was supposed to start.
 Liberty Basketball Association (LBA), 1991; played one pre-season exhibition game on February 10, 1991, before disbanding.
 Women's Basketball Association (WBA), 1993-1995  See: (WBA/WABA)
 American Basketball League (ABL), 1996–1998
 National Women's Basketball League (NWBL), 1998–2007
 Women's American Basketball Association (WABA), 2002
 Women's Minor League Basketball Association (WMLBA), 2016–2020

Asia 

 Women's Chinese University Basketball Super League (WCUBS), 2004–15

 Pinay Ballers League (2014-2018)
 Women's Philippine Basketball League (WPBL)

Oceania 

 Women's Basketball Championship (WBC)
 Women's Basketball Championship Division Two (WBC Division Two)
 Women's National Basketball League (WNBL)
 Women's Basketball League (WBL), conference-based second-tier league

References 

Basketball leagues